Golden Street is the second studio album by the pop band The Minders. It was released in 2001 on spinART.

Track listing
All songs written by Martyn Leaper, except for where noted.
"Golden Street" - 3:07
"Light" (Leaper, Rebecca Cole) - 2:11
"Treehouse - 4:10
"Hand on Heart" - 2:58
"We Never Shout" (Leaper, Cole) - 4:11
"Give Me Strength" - 2:32
"Right as Rain" - 4:15
"Instrumental" (Cole) - 0:57
"Sleeping Through Everything" - 2:17
"If You're Lonely" - 2:36
"Middle of the Part" - 3:24
"Nice Day for It" (Leaper, Cole) - 7:21
"Easy Now" - 3:09

References

The Minders albums
2001 albums
SpinART Records albums